Alvarado is one of the 212 municipalities of the Mexican state of Veracruz. The municipality is part of the state's Papaloapan Region and its municipal seat is established at the homonymous city of Alvarado.

History
In 1816, the citizens of the village of San Cristóbal de Alvarado sought the designation of Town from Ferdinand VII, King of Spain. The King granted the village the title of Town on 8 September 1816 by Royal Decree, which had a cost of 92,800 maravedís. Almost two years later, on 5 September 1818 the same Ferdinand VII authorized the first Honorable Ayuntamiento or city council. On 3 October 1818, the first City Council was established with Tomás Hondal serving as first Mayor.

Once the Independence War was over, the State enacted its own Constitution in which the state territory was divided in 4 departments and 12 cantons. The municipality of Alvarado was assigned to the Canton of Veracruz in the Department of Veracruz.

Geography

It is located in the state's Papaloapan region and is bordered by the municipalities of Boca del Río, Tlalixcoyan, Medellín, Ignacio de la Llave, Ixmatlahuacan, Acula, Tlacotalpan and Lerdo de Tejada.

Hydrography
The municipality is crossed by the Papaloapan and Blanco rivers, both of which drain into the Alvarado Lagoon complex.

The Alvarado Lagoon complex is formed, from north to south, by the Camaronera, Buen País, Alvarado and Tlalixcoyan lagoons.

Orography
Alvarado is located in the state's central coastal zone, within the Sotavento plains.

Climate
In this region there is hot/sub-humid —the wetter of the sub-humids— weather with abundant rains in summer. The dry season is from January to May and the period of rains starts in June. The nortes season starts in November and intensifies in January.

Infrastructure

Roads
The municipality is connected mainly through two Mexican Federal Highways and a few state and municipal roads.
 Highway 180 covers much of the municipality from north to south, connecting Alvarado with the municipalities of Medellín and Boca del Río to the north, and Lerdo de Tejada to the south. Prior to the building of the Alvarado toll bridge in the 1960s, ferries were used at the Papaloapan river's mouth to cross the river. 
 Highway 175 starts at Buenavista, at the south-end of the municipality, connecting with Tlacotalpan to the west. Highway 175 it passes over an upstream section of the Papaloapan River via the Tlacotalpan toll bridge.

Regarding state and municipal roads, the small network connects a few locations in the north and northwest areas of the municipality.

Administrative division 
The municipality counts with 265 settlements, from which 2 are urban.

Government

Municipal 
The mayor is elected by popular election for a 4-year term with non-limited, non-consecutive re-elections.

State and Federal 
The municipality is part of the XXIII State Electoral district and XIX Federal Electoral District.

See also
 City of Alvarado
 Veracruz

Notes

References 

Municipalities of Veracruz